The line-spotted barb (Enteromius lineomaculatus) is a species of cyprinid fish.

It is found in Burundi, Kenya, Rwanda, Tanzania, Uganda, Zambia, and Zimbabwe.
Its natural habitats are rivers, intermittent rivers, and inland deltas.
It is not considered a threatened species by the IUCN.

References

Enteromius
Cyprinid fish of Africa
Taxa named by George Albert Boulenger
Fish described in 1903
Taxonomy articles created by Polbot